Alphonse Marie Louis de Prat de Lamartine (21 October 179028 February 1869), was a French author, poet, and statesman who was instrumental in the foundation of the Second Republic and the continuation of the Tricolore as the flag of France.

Biography

Early years
Born in Mâcon, Burgundy on 21 October 1790 into a family of the French provincial nobility, Lamartine spent his youth at the family estate. He is famous for his partly autobiographical poem, "Le lac" ("The Lake"), which describes in retrospect the fervent love shared by a couple from the point of view of the bereaved man. Lamartine was masterly in his use of French poetic forms. Raised a devout  Catholic, Lamartine became a  pantheist, writing Jocelyn and La Chute d'un ange. He wrote Histoire des Girondins in 1847 in praise of the Girondists.

Lamartine made his entrance into the field of poetry with a masterpiece, Les Méditations Poétiques (1820) and awoke to find himself famous. One of the notable poems in this collection was Le Lac, which he dedicated to Julie Charles, the wife of a celebrated physician. He was made a Chevalier of the Legion of Honour in 1825. He worked for the French embassy in Italy from 1825 to 1828. In 1829, he was elected a member of the Académie française. He was elected as a member of the  Chamber of Deputies in 1833. In 1835 he published the Voyage en Orient, a brilliant and bold account of the journey he had just made, in royal luxury, to the countries of the Orient, and in the course of which he had lost his only daughter. From then on he confined himself to prose.

Political career

Lamartine, who was a former monarchist, came to embrace democratic ideals and opposed militaristic nationalism. Around 1830, Lamartine's opinions shifted in the direction of liberalism. When elected in 1833 to the  Chamber of Deputies, he quickly founded his own "Social Party" with some influence from Saint-Simonian ideas and established himself as a prominent critic of the July Monarchy, becoming more and more of a republican in the monarchy's last years.

He was briefly in charge of the government during the turbulence of 1848. He was Minister of Foreign Affairs from 24 February 1848 to 11 May 1848. Due to his great age, Jacques-Charles Dupont de l'Eure, Chairman of the Provisional Government, effectively delegated many of his duties to Lamartine. He was then a member of the Executive Commission, the political body which served as France's joint Head of State.

Lamartine was instrumental in the founding of the Second Republic of France, having met with Republican Deputies and journalists in the Hôtel de Ville to agree on the makeup of its provisional government. Lamartine himself was chosen to declare the Republic in traditional form in the balcony of the Hôtel de Ville, and ensured the continuation of the Tricolour as the flag of the nation.

On 25 February 1848 Lamartine said about the Tricolour Flag: 

During his term as a politician in the Second Republic, he led efforts that culminated in the abolition of slavery and the death penalty, as well as the enshrinement of the right to work and the short-lived national workshop programs. A political idealist who supported democracy and pacifism, his moderate stance on most issues caused many of his followers to desert him. He was an unsuccessful candidate in the presidential election of 10 December 1848, receiving fewer than 19,000 votes and losing to Louis Napoléon Bonaparte. He subsequently retired from politics and dedicated himself to literature.

Final years and legacy

He published volumes on the most varied subjects (history, criticism, personal confidences, literary conversations) especially during the Empire, when, having retired to private life and having become the prey of his creditors, he condemned himself to what he calls "literary hard-labor to exist and pay his debts". Lamartine ended his life in poverty, publishing monthly installments of the Cours familier de littérature to support himself. He died in Paris in 1869.

Nobel prize winner Frédéric Mistral's fame was in part due to the praise of Alphonse de Lamartine in the fortieth edition of his periodical Cours familier de littérature, following the publication of Mistral's long poem Mirèio. Mistral is the most revered writer in modern Occitan literature.

Lamartine is considered to be the first French romantic poet (though Charles-Julien Lioult de Chênedollé was working on similar innovations at the same time), and was acknowledged by Paul Verlaine and the Symbolists as an important influence. Leo Tolstoy also admired Lamartine, who was the subject of some discourses in his notebooks.

Other interests

Alphonse de Lamartine was also an Orientalist. He used themes and materials of the Levant and the Bible to create plotlines, heroes, and landscapes that resemble an exotic Oriental world. He also had a particular interest in Lebanon and the Middle East. He travelled to Lebanon, Syria and the Holy Land in 1832–33. During that trip, while he and his wife, the painter and sculptor Elisa de Lamartine, were in Beirut, on 6 December 1832, their only remaining child, Julia, died at ten years of age. It was, however, considered a journey of recovery and immersion in specific Christian icons, symbols, and terrain with his view that the region could bring about the rebirth of a new Christianity and spirituality that could save Europe from destruction.

During his trip to Lebanon he had met prince Bashir Shihab II and prince Simon Karam, who were enthusiasts of poetry. A valley in Lebanon is still called the Valley of Lamartine as a commemoration of that visit, and the Lebanon cedar forest still harbors the "Lamartine Cedar", which is said to be the cedar under which Lamartine had sat 200 years ago. Lamartine was so influenced by his trip that he staged his 1838 epic poem La Chute d'un ange (The Fall of an Angel) in Lebanon.

Raised by his mother to respect animal life, he found the eating of meat repugnant, saying 'One does not have one heart for Man and one for animals. One has a heart or one does not'. His writings in  La chute d’un Ange (1838) and Les confidences (1849) would be taken up by supporters of vegetarianism in the twentieth century.

Religious belief

On the spirit of the times

Thanks to the increase of general reason, to the light of philosophy, to the inspiration of Christianity, to the progress of the idea of justice, of charity, and of fraternity, in laws, manners, and religion, society in America, in Europe, and in France, especially since the Revolution, has broken down all these barriers, all these denominations of caste, all these injurious distinctions among men. Society is composed only of various conditions, professions, functions, and ways of life, among those who form what we call a Nation; of proprietors of the soil, and proprietors of houses; of investments, of handicrafts, of merchants, of manufacturers, of formers; of day-laborers becoming farmers, manufacturers, merchants, or possessors of houses or capital, in their turn; of the rich, of those in easy circumstances, of the poor, of workmen with their hands, workmen with their minds; of day-laborers, of those in need, of a small number of men enjoying considerable acquired or inherited wealth, of others of a smaller fortune painfully increased and improved, of others with property only sufficient for their needs; there are some, finally, without any personal possession but their hands, and gleaning for themselves and for their families, in the workshop, or the field, and at the threshold of the homes of others on the earth, the asylum, the wages, the bread, the instruction, the tools, the daily pay, all those means of existence which they have neither inherited, saved, nor acquired. These last are what have been improperly called the People.
— Atheism Among the People, by Alphonse de Lamartine (1850), pp. 19–20

On Catholic priests
Alphonse de Lamartine as quoted in "A Priest" by Robert Nash (1943) on Catholic priests:

"There is a man in every parish, having no family, but belonging to a family is worldwide; who is called in as a witness and adviser in all the important affairs of human life. No one comes into the world or goes out of it without his ministrations. He takes the child from its mother’s arms, and parts with him only at the grave. He blesses and consecrates the cradle, the bridal chamber, the bed of death, and the bier. He is one whom innocent children instinctively venerate and reverence, and to whom men of venerable age come to seek for wisdom, and call him father; at whose feet men fall down and lay bare the innermost thoughts of their souls, and weep their most sacred tears. He is one whose mission is to console the afflicted, and soften the pains of body and soul; to whose door come alike the rich and the poor. He belongs to no social class, because he belongs equally to all. He is one, in fine, who knows all, has a right to speak unreservedly, and whose speech, inspired from on high, falls on the minds and hearts of all with the authority of one who is divinely sent, and with the constraining power of one who has an unclouded faith."

On Muhammad
In his book Histoire de la Turquie (1854), Alphonse de Lamartine writes:

If greatness of purpose, smallness of means, and astounding results are the three criteria of human genius, who could dare to compare any great man in modern history with Muhammad? The most famous men created arms, laws and empires only. They founded, if anything at all, no more than material powers, which often crumbled away before their eyes. This man moved not only armies, legislation, empires, peoples and dynasties, but millions of men in one-third of the then-inhabited world; and more than that he moved the altars, the gods, the religions, the ideas, the beliefs and souls.... His forbearance in victory, his ambition which was entirely devoted to one idea and in no manner striving for an empire, his endless prayers, his mystic conversations with God, his death and his triumph after death – all these attest not to an imposture, but to a firm conviction, which gave him the power to restore a dogma. This dogma was two-fold: the unity of God and the immateriality of God; the former telling what God is, the latter telling what God is not; the one overthrowing false gods with the sword, the other starting an idea with the words. Philosopher, orator, apostle, legislator, warrior, conqueror of ideas, restorer of rational beliefs, of a cult without images; the founder of twenty terrestrial empires and of one spiritual empire, that is Muhammad. As regards all standards by which human greatness may be measured, we may well ask, is there any man greater than he.

Bibliography

 Saül (1818)
 Méditations poétiques (1820)
 Nouvelles Méditations (1823)
 Harmonies poétiques et religieuses (1830)
 Sur la politique rationnelle (1831)
 Voyage en Orient (1835)
 Jocelyn (1836)
 La chute d'un ange (1838)
 Recueillements poétiques (1839)
 Histoire des Girondins (1847)
 Histoire de la Révolution (1849)
 Histoire de la Russie (1849)
 Raphaël (1849)
 Confidences (1849)
 Toussaint Louverture (1850)
 Geneviève, histoire d'une servante (1851)
 Graziella (1852)
 Les visions (1853)
 Histoire de la Turquie (1854)
 Cours familier de littérature (1856)

See also

 French demonstration of 15 May 1848
 Lamartine Place Historic District in Manhattan, New York City
 Lamartine, Wisconsin

References

Further reading
 
 Wright, Gordon. "A Poet in Politics: Lamartine and the Revolution of 1848" History Today (Sep 1958) 8#9 pp 616-627

Online 
 Alphonse de Lamartine: French poet, historian, and statesman, in Britannica.com Online, by Henri Guillemin, The Editors of Encyclopaedia Britannica, Gloria Lotha and J.E. Luebering

External links

 
 
 
 Le Lac in English at Poems Found in Translation.
 Le lac Another English translation of Le Lac. More English translations at www.brindin.com.
 History of Vegetarianism: Alphonse de Lamartine
 Article on Lamartine from Bertrin, G. (1910) in The Catholic Encyclopedia. New York: Robert Appleton Company

1790 births
1869 deaths
19th-century heads of state of France
People from Mâcon
French untitled nobility
Politicians from Bourgogne-Franche-Comté
Legitimists
French republicans
Heads of state of France
Members of the 2nd Chamber of Deputies of the July Monarchy
Members of the 3rd Chamber of Deputies of the July Monarchy
Members of the 4th Chamber of Deputies of the July Monarchy
Members of the 5th Chamber of Deputies of the July Monarchy
Members of the 6th Chamber of Deputies of the July Monarchy
Members of the 7th Chamber of Deputies of the July Monarchy
Members of the 1848 Constituent Assembly
Members of the National Legislative Assembly of the French Second Republic
French poets
Romantic poets
French autobiographers
French memoirists
Writers from Bourgogne-Franche-Comté
French male poets
19th-century French poets
19th-century French male writers
Members of the Académie Française
French people of the Revolutions of 1848
Knights of the Order of Saint Joseph
French male non-fiction writers
19th-century memoirists
French duellists